Carex parviflora, called the small-flowered sedge, is a species of flowering plant in the genus Carex, native to central and southern Europe. Its chromosome number is 2n=54.

References

parviflora
Flora of Central Europe
Flora of Southeastern Europe
Flora of Southwestern Europe
Plants described in 1801